P. Angalane is an Indian politician and Independent. He was elected as a member of the Puducherry Legislative Assembly from Thirubuvanai (constituency). He defeated B. Kobiga of All India N.R. Congress by 2,359 votes in 2021 Puducherry Assembly election.

References 

Living people
Year of birth missing (living people)
21st-century Indian politicians
People from Puducherry
All India NR Congress politicians
Independent politicians in India
Indian National Congress politicians
Puducherry MLAs 2021–2026
Puducherry MLAs 2011–2016